Bishop Severian Stefan Yakymyshyn, O.S.B.M. (22 April 1930 – 6 September 2021) was a Canadian Ukrainian Greek Catholic hierarch. He served as an Eparchial Bishop of Ukrainian Catholic Eparchy of New Westminster from 5 January 1995 until his retirement 1 June 2007.

Life
Bishop Yakymyshyn was born in the family of ethnical Ukrainian Greek-Catholics in Canada. After the school education, he subsequently joined the Order of Saint Basil the Great, where he had a solemn profession on January 1, 1953. Yakymyshyn was ordained as a priest on May 19, 1955, after he completed theological studies. Then he continued his studies in the Pontifical Gregorian University in Rome, Italy with degree of Doctor of Sacred Theology.

After that he had various pastoral assignments and served as a parish priest, spiritual director, master of novices and  lecturer at St. Paul University in Ottawa. From 1979 until 1995 he served in the Basilian General Curia in Rome.

On January 5, 1995, Fr. Yakymyshyn was nominated by Pope John Paul II and on March 25, 1995 consecrated to the Episcopate as the second Eparchial Bishop of the Ukrainian Catholic Eparchy of New Westminster. The principal consecrator was Metropolitan Maxim Hermaniuk. Bishop Yakymyshyn retired on June 1, 2007, after reaching the age limit.

Bishop Yakymyshyn died in Vancouver at the age 91.

References

1930 births
2021 deaths
People from Two Hills, Alberta
Pontifical Gregorian University alumni
Canadian Eastern Catholic bishops
20th-century Eastern Catholic bishops
21st-century Eastern Catholic bishops
Bishops of the Ukrainian Greek Catholic Church
Canadian members of the Ukrainian Greek Catholic Church
Order of Saint Basil the Great
Canadian people of Ukrainian descent